William Dacre may refer to:

William Dacre, 2nd Baron Dacre (1319–1361)
William Dacre, 5th Baron Dacre (1357–1398)
William Dacre, 3rd Baron Dacre (1497–1563)